Concealed may refer to:

 Concealed (album), a 2004 album by Augury
 The Concealed, a 2012 album by John Zorn

See also